

The Pharr Texas Port of Entry is located at the Pharr–Reynosa International Bridge on the United States-Mexico border. The tolling operation on the US side of the bridge is operated by the city of Pharr, Texas.  The bridge opened in 1994, and since 1996, northbound trucks from Reynosa have not been to permitted to cross at the Hidalgo Texas Port of Entry.  This has made Pharr a major commercial port of entry.

References

See also

 List of Mexico–United States border crossings
 List of Canada–United States border crossings

Mexico–United States border crossings
Pharr, Texas
1994 establishments in Texas
Transport infrastructure completed in 1994
Buildings and structures in Hidalgo County, Texas